Local elections were held in Nairobi County to elect a Governor and County Assembly on 4 March 2013. Under the new constitution, which was passed in a 2010 referendum, the 2013 general election was the first where there would be election of County governors and their deputies for the 47 newly created counties. They were also the first general elections run by the Independent Electoral and Boundaries Commission(IEBC) which has released the official list of candidates. While it is not necessary to hold a degree to become e.g. president of the United States, a degree of a university recognised in Kenya is necessary to run for a gubernator seat.

Gubernatorial election

Opinion Polling

Prospective candidatures
The following politicians made public their intentions to run but did not run or failed to obtain nominations in their preferred political parties:  
 John Gakuo Former Town Clerk, City Council of Nairobi
 Timothy Muriuki
 Margaret Wanjiru MP for Starehe Constituency

Gakuo and Muriuki failed in the TNA nominations while Wanjiru was barred by her party due to questions over the validity of her university degree.

References

 

2013 local elections in Kenya